Street News was a street newspaper sold by homeless people in New York City. Established in 1989, it was founded and launched by Hutchinson Persons and Wendy Oxenhorn, this was the starting of the American street newspaper movement, and provided a way of self-sufficiency to the many homeless and unemployed people in New York, starting at the price of 1 $ of which 25 cents were use to maintain the business and 75 was the profit for the vendors.

History 
Street News began publication in October 1989, founded by its Editor-In-Chief, rock musician Hutchinson Persons, founder of Street Aid and Wendy Oxenhorn (then Koltun). It was funded by individuals and Corporations like Cushman and Wakefield  as well as selling advertising space in the paper. New York Times president Lance Primis joined the organization's Board of Advisors and gave special assistance.

Launching 

It was launched with advertisements on subways and buses donated by the Metropolitan Transportation Authority and the homeless salesforce promoted Street news, weeks after panhandling was declared illegal on the subways, but the vendors were allowed to sell the Street News in the surroundings of metro train areas. Former homeless man and crack addict Lee Stringer was first vendor and then editor and columnist for Street News. He is now a writer and motivates young people to stay away from crime.

Growing business 

The New York Times came out with the first article written by Sam Roberts which then garnered wide media attention. Sales grew very quickly from an initial 50,000 copies to over a million sold in its first four months of publication. Celebrities such as Paul Newman, Liza Minnelli and the Beach Boys contributed opinion pieces. It sold for 75 cents, with the sellers getting 45 cents (plus the first 10 copies free).

Problems 

Co-founder Wendy Oxenhorn left Streetnews after the first year as stated in a NY Times article over "philosophical differences on how to run the organization." The initial media and public excitement about the paper eventually faded, and the paper experienced financial troubles in the early 1990s; Some staff left and started the short-lived Crossroads Magazine. In 1991 New York's Metropolitan Transportation Authority instituted a policy prohibiting the hawking of newspapers on the subways and putting the vendors in jail while were working in their best selling places; this added to Street News troubles. 

Its printer, Sam Chen of Expedi Printing, became the new owner after Persons left the paper. Chen attempted to turn a profit from Street News, but financial problems continued into the mid-nineties, with changing public attitude towards the homeless, low content and attempts by the city to sweep away homeless people. 

By the mid-1990s, Street News sales had dropped significantly and some predicted that the newspaper was going to end. Janet Wickenhaver became its editor and associate publisher she revamped the dropping business changing the focus on celebrities to add more content on social issues, eventually, though, the paper survived and revitalized, but never reached the circulation of the first few months.,  the editor was John Levi "Indio" Washington Jr. Street News prints 3,000 copies of six issues per year, sold by 15 people getting 75 cents out of the $1.25 price.

Cancellation 

It has since ceased to exist. As of current time, Street News is no longer an active publication and New York City has no official street paper.

Legacy 

The creation of Street News quickly inspired the founding of many other street newspapers, including Chicago's StreetWise Boston's Spare Change News and the UK's The Big Issue;  the paper has been called a "pioneer" for the street paper movement. Street News and The Big Issue have become prototypes of street papers worldwide.

See also 
 Wendy Oxenhorn
 North American Street Newspaper Association
 International Network of Street Papers
 Street newspaper
 The Doe Fund
 Coalition for the Homeless
 StreetWise

References

External links 
 Official website

Street newspapers
Newspapers established in 1989
Newspapers published in New York City
1989 establishments in New York City
Publications with year of disestablishment missing